John Hyatt (12 January 1767 – 30 January 1826) was an English nonconformist pastor and missionary. He found Wesleyan theology as a young man and went on to become a much loved and revered driving force of early Methodism in London, becoming influential in continuing the First Great Awakening started by George Whitefield in the 1740s. Hyatt preached regularly in the slums of Hackney in London's East End. He gained a large following and was always in demand for his sermons, which were greatly influenced by those of John Wesley and George Whitefield.

Family

John Hyatt was born on 12 January 1767 in Sherborne, Dorset, to John Guppy Hyatt and Elizabeth Hyatt. He was baptised on 24 January 1767, in Sherborne. Hyatt died on 30 January 1826, aged 59, in Hackney, London, and was buried in Bunhill Fields, London.

Hyatt married at the age of 20 years and his wife, Elizabeth Westcombe, was born in 1765 in Kingston, Somerset to William Westcombe and Eleanor Varder. She was baptised on 8 February 1765, in Kingston St Mary, Somerset. She died in 1832, aged about 67, and was also buried in Bunhill Fields cemetery.

Elizabeth Westcombe was a niece of the Rev. Daniel Varder, a Dissenting Minister, who arrived in Sherborne around 1757. Some time after this, his niece Elizabeth Westcombe joined him. Daniel Varder was ordained a Minister on 6 October 1757 in Sherborne.

Of Hyatt's parents, little is known other than that his father was abandoned as a young man when his own father left for the East Indies from Sherborne. There is no trace of his demise. It is said of Hyatt's father "that having no friends possessed of considerable means, was taken in and trained up amidst scenes of obscurity and dependence. When but very young, he entered upon the married life, after which he commenced business in a small public house in his native town, where, by the aid of divine providence, and a prudent and excellent wife, he brought up a numerous family in decency and comfort".

Hyatt had at least one son, Charles, who also became a nonconformist minister, and the pastor of Ebenezer Chapel, Shadwell, London. The Rev. Charles Hyatt published a number of sermons, the most famous being The Sinner Detected: A Sermon Preached in the Open Air, near the Red Barn in Polstead, and at the Meeting-house, Boxford, Suffolk, and in the Afternoon and Evening of Sunday, the 17th of August, 1828, on the Occasion of the Execution of William Corder for the Murder of Maria Marten (London: Westley and Davis, 1828). Charles Hyatt had a daughter, Elizabeth, who married another nonconformist preacher, the Rev. Benjamin Moore, minister of the Meeting-House in Boxford, Suffolk.

Biography
Hyatt was said to be a young man of ill repute, brought up in the Crosskeys inn, Sherborne, Dorset (still existing today). At 14 he was an apprentice cabinet maker. At 18 he took charge of the cabinet makers upon the death of the owner, but he was not really interested. He was more interested in spending his time at the family inn, drinking and getting into bad company. He soon became "ungodly" and took to "sinful pleasures" In his late teens he met Elizabeth Westcombe. Her father had an extensive library and Hyatt soon began to educate himself there in order to be close to Elizabeth. They married in 1787.

According to Alfred W Light's book about the Bunhill Fields burial ground in London, one of Hyatt's unnamed biographers said this of his relationship with his father:

In 1794 he became friendly with the Rev J. Weston, a visiting Wesleyan preacher. This led to Hyatt preaching his first sermon at Compton, near Sherborne. Over the next two years he visited chapels nearby to preach and gained a good following, including in Mere, Wiltshire, where he built a chapel.

Hyatt was ordained on 17 July 1798. He then moved to Frome in Somerset and in 1799 he became the Pastor of the Zion Congregational Church in that town, but soon resigned that office in May 1805 when his peers in the church sent him (not entirely at his own wish) to London. He was sent to Whitefield's Tabernacle, Tottenham Court Road to become the co-pastor with Matthew Wilks (father of John Wilks). In relinquishing his Frome charge, much to the distress of his congregation, he said: 

In 1805 he became co-pastor and a Minister of the London Tabernacle for the next 20 years or so until his death from asthma, becoming a celebrated man.  Among his many spiritual and charitable works he was instrumental in founding the Aged Pilgrims' Friend Society, originally set-up in 1807 to provide grants and pensions to needy elderly Christians. As recorded in Mr. J. E. Hazelton's "Inasmuch", Hyatt was closely connected with the society and he drew up the second address that was issued by the committee. The ministry has grown so that it now has 16 schemes throughout England, providing a range of services for older people, from sheltered housing through to nursing and dementia care, as well as home-leave accommodation for missionary families.

During his time at the tabernacle, Hyatt was well known for his forthright sermons which were printed eagerly by the popular press and the evangelical chronicles of the time. These publications generated vast amounts of income for the church and for John, most of which he passed to missions and friendly societies in his travels. His career was well followed in the press as he travelled around the countryside preaching to any that would listen, especially those congregations in the chapels set up by Selina Hastings, Countess of Huntingdon during The Countess of Huntingdon's Connexion, a small society of evangelical churches founded in 1783 and strongly associated with the Calvinist Methodist movement of George Whitefield. Hyatt was greatly involved with charitable societies, often being seen at meetings of the London Missionary Society and seamen's missions along the Thames. He is also to be found in Dublin in 1821, preaching there and in more than 40 other towns and villages in the north of Ireland. Over the next few years he is to be found preaching in Kent, Wiltshire, Bristol, Northampton, York and many other places that wanted to hear his renowned sermons. He was very well respected, and influenced the likes of Edward Mote, who wrote more than one hundred hymns published in his book, "Hymns of Praise (London, 1836). His hymn, "The Solid Rock" lives on today in many church services. During his life in London, John lived at 61 Great Russell St., Bloomsbury Square.

Quote:

Notes
Listed in the Surman Index is a short history of his career.

 1790–1796 Compton Dorset and Itinerant
 1796–n.d. Mere Wiltshire (Pastor)
 1798–1800 Mere Wiltshire
 1800–1805 Frome Somerset
 1805–1826 Tabernacle, London Middlesex (Co-Pastor)

References

 
Will of Reverend John Hyatt, Resident Minister of the Tabernacle and Tottenham Court Chapel of Tottenham Court, Middlesex 7 April 1826 PROB 11/1711 The National Archives

1767 births
1826 deaths
British chaplains
English Methodist missionaries
18th-century English Anglican priests
Evangelical Anglicans
English evangelists
Methodist theologians
Burials at Bunhill Fields
Methodist missionaries in Europe
English Anglican missionaries
Protestant missionaries in England
Protestant missionaries in Ireland